Theophilea is a genus of beetles in the family Cerambycidae, containing the following species:

 Theophilea cylindricollis Pic, 1895
 Theophilea subcylindricollis Hladil, 1988

References

Agapanthiini